Jorge Carreño Luengas (1929 – 13 April 2022) was a Colombian jurist who served as President of the Supreme Court.

References

Date of birth missing
1929 births
2022 deaths
20th-century Colombian judges